Washington Township is a township in Jackson County, Iowa, USA. It was organized from areas of the original Bellevue and Van Buren Townships. Washington Township is 25,536 acres or 39.9 square miles with 2.2 square miles covered with water. The landscape includes numerous lakes and streams including the Maquoketa River.

History
Washington Township was established in 1851.

References

Townships in Jackson County, Iowa
Townships in Iowa
1851 establishments in Iowa
Populated places established in 1851